New Kung Fu Cult Master 1 is a 2022 Hong Kong-Chinese wuxia film directed by Wong Jing and Venus Keung adapted from Louis Cha's novel The Heaven Sword and Dragon Saber. The film stars Louis Koo, Donnie Yen, Raymond Lam, Janice Man, Yun Qianqian and Sabrina Qiu.

The film was theatrically released on 28 January 2022 in Singapore, while it was released on streaming platforms on 31 January 2022 in China. A sequel, New Kung Fu Cult Master 2, was released on streaming platforms on 3 February 2022 in China.

Cast

Louis Koo as Cheung Chui-san
Donnie Yen as Cheung Sam-fung (special appearance)
Raymond Lam as Cheung Mo-kei
Chaney Lin as 15-year-old Cheung Mo-kei
Janice Man as Chiu Man
Yun Qianqian as Siu-chiu
Sabrina Qiu as Chow Chi-yeuk
Elvis Tsui as Tse Shun
Alex Fong as Yeung Chiu
Raymond Wong Ho-yin as Wai Yat-siu
Jade Leung as Abbess Mit-juet
Rebecca Zhu as Yan So-so
Lam Chi-chung as Wah Shan Elder
Zhang Xuan as Ting Man-kwan
Derek Kok as Fan Yiu
Tin Kai-man as Wah Shan Elder
Yu Kang as Hok Pat-yung
Mars as Hung Man
Wilfred Lau as Sung Ching-shu
Felix Lok as Yan Tin-ching
Parkman Wong as Sung Yuen-kiu
Asano Nagahide as Yue Lin-chau
Dominic Ho as Yan Lei-hang
Edward Chui as Cheung Chung-kai
Ken Hung as Mok Sing-kuk
Jason Wong as Yu Toi-ngam
Chang Yuci as Elder sister Seung
Lu Yan as Elder sister Luk
Ding Yusen as Luk Cheung-hak
Xing Yu as Sing Kwan
Louis Fan as Dog
Hung Yan-yan as Cat
Wiyona Yeung as Chow Chi-yeuk's mother

Production
On 21 December 2019, Wong Jing posted a teaser poster of the film on his Sina Weibo account and stating that Zhang Wuji will finally meet with Zhao Min in Dadu, hinting he will be making a follow-up to his 1993 film Kung Fu Cult Master, which ended in a cliffhanger. Principal photography began for the film began in January 2020 at the Hengdian World Studios. However, production was halted two weeks later due to the COVID-19 pandemic and was resumed in mid-April of the same year. On 7 May 2020, director Wong released stills of the cast in their characters on his Sina Weibo account.

On 2 January 2022, Wong announced on his Sina Weibo account that the film had been split into two parts, New Kung Fu Cult Master 1 and New Kung Fu Cult Master 2, to be released during the Chinese New Year period of the year. This later led to speculations that the cast was having disagreements with the production over salary disputes, but cast member Donnie Yen later responded to this by stating that he knew that it was going to be a duology from the start.

Release
New Kung Fu Cult Master 1 premiered with theatrical release in Singapore on 28 January 2022 while in China, the film was released on 31 January 2022 in China on streaming platforms with a fee of RMB¥5 to stream the film.

References

External links

2022 films
2022 action films
2022 martial arts films
Hong Kong action films
Hong Kong martial arts films
Chinese action films
Chinese martial arts films
Wuxia films
Tai chi films
Shaw Brothers Studio films
2020s Cantonese-language films
2020s Mandarin-language films
Films based on works by Jin Yong
Works based on The Heaven Sword and Dragon Saber
Films set in the Yuan dynasty
Films about rebels
Films directed by Wong Jing